Hana Moll (born January 31, 2005) is an American track and field athlete who competes in pole vault. She won the 2022 IAAF World Junior Championships.

Personal life
Moll attends Capital High School in Olympia, Washington. Her twin sister Amanda is also a competitor in pole vault with a personal best of 4.51m, a world record height for an under 18 female athlete, and a world leading junior height going into the 2022 World Junior Championships in which she finished fifth. Their parents are Erik and Paula Moll.

Career
Twice in January 2022, Moll broke her personal best, first at the Texas Elite Pole Vault EXPO Explosion on January 1, 2022, and second as she won the age group category at the 2022 Pole Vault Summit in Reno, Nevada. She cleared 4.47m with her twin sister Amanda finishing second in the event. Both twins are coached by Mike Strong in Washington and train in multiple disciplines. Moll won the gold medal at the 2022 IAAF World Junior Championships in Cali, Colombia, clearing 4.35m on the day.

References

External links

2005 births
Living people
Track and field athletes from Washington (state)
American female pole vaulters
World Athletics U20 Championships winners
Twin sportspeople
American twins